Tom Ben Zaken is an Israeli footballer who plays F.C. Ashdod. Ben Zaken is the son of Jacky Ben Zaken, a former F.C. Ashdod's owner.

Career
Ben Zaken started his career in F.C. Ashdod. On 8 May 2012, Ben Zaken made his debut in the senior team in the 2–1 win against Bnei Sakhnin.

On 29 September 2018, Ben Zaken scored his debut career goal in the 1–4 loss against Maccabi Netanya.

Honours
 F.C. Ashdod
Liga Leumit: 2015–16

Career statistics

References

External links
 

1994 births
Living people
Israeli footballers
F.C. Ashdod players
Israeli Premier League players
Liga Leumit players
Footballers from Ashdod
Association football defenders